Ulla-Førre is a hydropower complex in Southern Norway. It is situated along the borders of the municipalities of Suldal and Hjelmeland (in Rogaland county) and Bykle (in Agder county), Norway. The hydroelectric power stations in the complex are Saurdal, Kvilldal, Hylen and Stølsdal, operated by Statkraft.

Blåsjø
Blåsjø is the tenth largest lake in Norway by area. It is located in the municipality of Bykle in Agder county and the municipalities of Hjelmeland and Suldal in Rogaland county. At the highest regulated water level, Blåsjø contains  of water.

Kvilldal Hydroelectric Power Station
The Kvilldal Power Station is a located in the municipality of Suldal.

Saurdal Hydroelectric Power Station
The Saurdal Power Station is a hydroelectric and pumped-storage power station located in the municipality of Suldal.

Hylen Hydroelectric Power Station
The Hylen Power Station is located at the bottom of Hylsfjord in Suldal. The plant exploits water through a tunnel from the lake Suldalsvatnet.

References

External links

 Brochure 
 

Hydroelectric power stations in Norway
Dams in Norway
Pumped-storage hydroelectric power stations